Deep Creek is a  long 2nd order tributary to the Little River in Hoke County, North Carolina.

Course
Deep Creek rises on the Nicholson Creek divide about 0.25 miles north of Gaddys Mountain in Hoke County, North Carolina.  Deep Creek then flows northeasterly to meet the Little River about 3 miles southeast of Mt. Pleasant.

Watershed
Deep Creek drains  of area, receives about 47.7 in/year of precipitation, has a topographic wetness index of 447.26 and is about 48% forested.

References

Rivers of North Carolina
Rivers of Hoke County, North Carolina